Boechera crandallii, or Crandall's rockcress, is found in Wyoming and Colorado where it is found on limestone chip-rock and stony areas, often among sagebrush. Flowering time is from May to June.

According to chromosome counts by Rollins (1941 and 1966) B. crandalli has been identified as a diploid with n=7 which presumably reproduces sexually.

References 

crandallii
Flora of Colorado
Flora of Wyoming
Flora of North America